Visa requirements for Nauruan citizens are administrative entry restrictions by the authorities of other states placed on citizens of Nauru. As of 2 July 2019, Nauruan citizens had visa-free or visa on arrival access to 85 countries and territories, ranking the Nauruan passport 61st in terms of travel freedom according to the Henley Passport Index.

Visa requirements map

Visa requirements

Dependent, Disputed, or Restricted territories
Unrecognized or partially recognized countries

Dependent and autonomous territories

See also
Visa policy of Nauru
Nauruan passport

References and Notes
References

Notes

Nauru
Foreign relations of Nauru